Tenacibaculum litoreum is a bacterium from the genus of Tenacibaculum which has been isolated from tidal flat sediments from Ganghwa in Korea.

References

External links
Type strain of Tenacibaculum litoreum at BacDive -  the Bacterial Diversity Metadatabase

Flavobacteria
Bacteria described in 2006